Mitchell Park is a suburb on the north-western rural-urban fringe of Ballarat in Victoria, Australia. Mitchell Park contains the Ballarat Airport.

References

Suburbs of Ballarat